Sun Yat-sen Memorial Secondary School, was established in memory of Sun Yat-sen, the founding father of the Republic of China and the Premier of the Kuomintang in 1934. The school is located in Cuiheng Village, Zhongshan, Guangdong, China. Cuiheng Village is Sun Yat-sen's hometown. It is next to the former residence of Sun Yat-sen (zh-CN: 孙中山故居纪念馆). There are 120 home classes in the full boarding school with more than 7000 students.

History 
Sun Yat-sen Memorial Secondary School was founded in Guangdong Province by Sun Fo, then President of the Legislative Yuan of the Republic of China and the eldest son of Dr. Sun Yat-sen, the great forerunner of democratic revolution. The school was set up to inherit the wishes of Sun Yat-sen which development and personnel training are the root of prosperity and strength. The initial name of the school was "Premier's Hometown Memorial School" (私立總理故鄉紀念中學校) in 1934. After the Chinese Civil War and the Communist Party of China took power in 1949, the school was renamed "Sun Yat-sen Memorial Secondary School". The existing school name was inscribed by Soong Ching-ling, the Honorary Chairwoman of People's Republic of China and the widow of Dr. Sun, in 1978.

School site construction was completed in 1934 and began to enroll students from all over the country. In 1953, Sun Yat-sen Memorial Secondary School was designated as one of the first 7 key secondary schools, and in 1994 one of the first Top Level schools in Guangdong Province. In 2006 and 2007, this school passed both the primary assessment and re-evaluation as Experimental and Leading Secondary School of State Level with the highest scores.

List of Presidents

Rankings 
Sun Yat-sen Memorial Secondary School is one of the first top-grade schools of Guangdong Province and  one of the first key high schools of Guangdong Province. In 2006, it became one of the first national demonstrative ordinary high schools.

Alumni 
 Ye Xuanping, the former member of the Central Committee of the Communist Party of China and the vice-chairman of the CPPCC National Committee.
 Gan Ziyu, the former member of the Commission for Discipline Inspection of the Central Committee of the CPC, the member of National People's Congress (NPC) Standing Committee, the chairman of the overseas Chinese Committee of the National People's Congress.
 Chen Daming, the former secretary of the party committee and dean of Beijing University of Aeronautics and Astronautic, the deputy proprietor of the Xinhua News Agency, Hong Kong branch.
 Yu Zhenxin, the professor and doctoral supervisor of Sun Yat-sen University.
 Liang Xiuling, the distinguished professor and doctoral supervisor of department of neurology of the First Affiliated Hospital, Sun Yat-sen University.
 Yin Bingsheng, the former director of hospital and doctoral supervisor of Zhejiang University Medical College Affiliated Sir Run Shaw Hospital.
 Sheldon Xiong, director of debate programs for BL Debate in Vancouver, British Columbia, Canada.

Cultural tradition 
School Marks
 Architectural Style: red walls and green tiles.
 World Cultural Heritage: architecture of the Republic of China.
 School Tree: kapok tree.
 School Flower: phoenix flower.
 School Uniform: white shirts and blue trousers for boys, blue shirts and black trousers for girls.

Student activities
 Daily Activities - There are a lot of student activities in Sun Yat-sen Memorial Secondary School, such as Singing from the Heart Competition, School Ambassador Competition, Host Contest, New Year's Day Party, Art Festival, Dancing with the Heart Competition, Garment Design Contest. Charity Sale and so on.
 Associations - There are more than 90 student associations, which were founded and organized by students, including dance, chess, animation, musical instruments, foreign languages, astronomy, sports, rap etc.

References

External links

High schools in Guangdong